.bb is the Internet country code top-level domain (ccTLD) for Barbados.

History
The .bb top-level domain has been maintained by several administrators since its creation, the first of which being the University of Puerto Rico. 

In 1996, the Government of Barbados sought the relegation of .bb to the incumbent local exchange carrier, Cable & Wireless (BARTEL) Ltd. 

A 2001 Memorandum of Understanding was then later signed between the Government of Barbados and both Cable & Wireless (Bartel) Ltd. and its sister company Cable & Wireless (BET) Ltd., to continue the administration of the ".bb" domains until the government selected alternate directives. 

In November 2007, .bb was again relegated to the Telecoms Unit within the Government of Barbados.

The Government has indicated that the government's policy will be to maintain a semi-restricted domain. Legal issues regarding domains are to be handled by the Corporate Affairs and Intellectual Property Office (CAIPO) arm of the Government.

The fee for Barbados' main ccTLD and all of the second and third-level domains is BBD$120 annually. This pricing is significantly higher than most other domains, which has discouraged its use. At present the .bb namespace does not allow for commercial licenses to entities without some connection to Barbados.

At present, any person desirous of registering a ".bb" domain is required to fill out Form TU052 and send it the Telecommunications Unit for review. However, it is now possible to submit the form electronically via an online portal hosted on the GovOS platform.

Second-level domains
 - general use (usually commercial)
 - commercial entities
 - network providers
 - general use (usually for not-for-profit organisations)
 - Barbadian government organisations
 - Barbadian educational organisations
 - general use
 - general use
 - general use
 - general use

Timeline

1991-09 – University of Puerto Rico is delegated the .bb domain.
1996 – The .bb ccTLD becomes re-delegated from Univ. of Puerto Rico to Cable & Wireless.
2001-10-16 – The Government of Barbados and Cable & Wireless sign a MOU for the later to maintain interim-administration of the .bb ccTLD.
2007-11 – The Government of Barbados assumes total administration and control of the .bb ccTLD from C&W.

See also 
 Internet in Barbados
 ISO 3166-2:BB
 List of Internet top-level domains

References

External links
 IANA .bb whois information
 Redelegation of the .BB Top-Level Domain November 2007
 The Min. of Finance, Investment, Telecommunications and Energy (MFIE)
 Whois search tool for registered .bb ccTLDs

Communications in Barbados
Country code top-level domains
Computer-related introductions in 1991
Internet in Barbados

sv:Toppdomän#B